Tangna is a 1973 Iranian film directed by Amir Naderi. It was Naderi's second movie. The actors were Saeed Rad, Noori Kasrai, Enayat Bakhshi, Mohammad Eskandari and Mehri Vadadian.

Plot
Ali Khoshdast is involved in a fight and accidentally kills a man. After a desperate flight from the revenge-seeking relatives of the victim, he takes refuge with his fiancée.

References

External links
Tangna in IMDb

Iranian crime films
1973 films
1970s Persian-language films

Films directed by Amir Naderi
Iranian drama films